Kyung, also spelled Kyoung, Gyeong, Kyeong, or Kyong, is an uncommon Korean family name, as well as a single-syllable Korean given name and an element in many two-syllable Korean given names.

As a family name
The 2000 South Korean Census found 15,784 people with the family name Kyung. It may be written with either of two different hanja. Those with the name meaning "scenery" may belong to one of two different bon-gwan: Haeju, South Hwanghae, in what is today North Korea, and Taein (泰仁). There is only one bon-gwan for the other Kyung surname, meaning "celebration": Cheongju, Chungcheongbuk-do, in what is today South Korea. In a study by the National Institute of the Korean Language based on 2007 application data for South Korean passports, it was found that 69.2% of people with this surname spelled it in Latin letters as Kyung in their passports, while another 19.2% spelled it as Kyoung. The Revised Romanisation spelling Gyeong came in third place at 7.6%. Rarer alternative spellings (the remaining 4.0%) included Kyeong.

People with the surname Kyung include:
Gyeong Dae-seung (1154–1183), Goryeo Dynasty general
Kyong Won-ha (born 1928), North Korean nuclear scientist
Kyung Soo-jin (born 1987), South Korean actress
Kyung Sung-hyun (born 1990), South Korean alpine skier
Kyeong Jae-seok (born 2000), South Korean figure skater

In given names
Kyung is an element in many popular Korean given names. The meaning differs based on the hanja used. There are 54 hanja with this reading, and variant forms of six of those, on the South Korean government's official list of hanja which may be used in given names; they are listed in the table above (one variant is not included due to encoding issues). In the 1940s through 1970s, many popular names for newborn girls in South Korea contained this element, including:

First syllable
Kyung-hee (9th place in 1950, 3rd place in 1960)
Kyung-ja (3rd place in 1940)
Kyung-ok (10th place in 1950)
Kyung-sook (7th place in 1950, 5th place in 1960)

Second syllable
Eun-kyung (8th place in 1970)
Mi-kyung (1st place in 1960, 7th place in 1970)

Other names beginning with this element include:

Kyung-ah
Kyung-chul
Kyung-gu
Kyung-ho
Kyung-jae
Kyung-joon
Kyung-ju
Kyung-hee
Kyung-hwa
Kyung-hwan
Kyung-lim
Kyung-min
Kyung-mo
Kyung-seok
Kyung-soo
Kyung-sun
Kyung-tae
Kyung-taek
Kyung-wan
Kyung-won

Other names ending with this element include:

Bo-kyung
Hee-kyung
Hye-kyung
Hyun-kyung
Ja-kyung
Jae-kyung
Min-kyung
Seong-gyeong
Soo-kyung
Yi-kyung
Yoo-kyung

People with the given name Kyung include:
Kyung Lah (born 1971), Korean-American journalist
Sol Kyong (born 1990), North Korean judo practitioner
Park Kyung (born 1992), South Korean rapper and record producer
Hong Kyung (born 1996), South Korean actor

See also
List of Korean given names

References

Korean-language surnames
Korean given names